Ramgram is a town and municipality that is the capital of the Parasi District in Lumbini Province of Nepal. At the time of the 2011 Nepal census, it had a population of 25,990 in 4,972 households. The former name, Parasi, is still widely used.

This roadway is also called Tanka Prasad Acharya Marga. Jeeps and buses run through this roadway from Sunwal Jeep Station. It is also connected through a highway,  from Bumahi, a small town connected to Mahendra Highway.

Ramgram is mainly Hindu, but it is also an important place for Buddhists, because it is the location of Ramagrama stupa. This stupa, which was constructed around 2500 BCE, contains one of the relics of Buddha. Every year, about 7,000 tourists visit the stupa.

 southwest of the Ramgram stupa is another temple known as Pali Bhagvati Temple, which is dedicated to Durga Goddess. There is a small river known as Jharahi. The place is situated in Ujaingadha, now known as Ujaini. It is also known as the maternal house of Gautam Buddha.

Twin towns – sister cities

 Kathmandu

References

Municipalities in Lumbini Province
Nepal municipalities established in 1997
Populated places in Parasi District